The 67th Grey Cup was played on November 25, 1979 before 65,113 fans at Olympic Stadium in Montreal. The Edmonton Eskimos defeated the Montreal Alouettes 17–9.

Box Score
First Quarter

Edmonton - TD – Waddell Smith 43 yard pass from Tom Wilkinson (Dave Cutler convert)
Montreal – FG – Don Sweet 38 yards

Second Quarter

Montreal – FG – Don Sweet 45 yards

Third Quarter

Montreal – FG – Don Sweet 29 yards
Edmonton - TD – Tom Scott 33 yard pass from Warren Moon (Dave Cutler convert)
Edmonton – FG – Dave Cutler 38 yards

Fourth Quarter

No scoring

Trivia 

Unlike previous Grey Cups, especially the 65th Grey Cup (or Ice Bowl) in 1977 in Montreal, the temperature was a balmy 12 degrees Celsius.

The Alouettes were penalized 16 times in the game, the most back-breaking call coming late in the fourth quarter when Gerry Dattilio was called for clipping on an 85-yard punt return for a touchdown by Keith Baker. Edmonton had only four penalties.

Despite winning the game, the Eskimos were shut out of the Most Valuable Player and Most Valuable Canadian awards, all of which went to Alouette players.

Edmonton and Montreal have met in 11 Grey Cup clashes. The Eskimos prevailed in 1954, 1955, 1956, 1975, 1978, 1979, 2003 and 2005's overtime thriller. The Als were victorious in 1974, the Ice Bowl of 1977, and 2002.

As of 2021, the 1979 game is the last Grey Cup in which a team was held to a single-digit point total.

External links
 

Grey Cup
Grey Cup
Grey Cups hosted in Montreal
Montreal Alouettes
Edmonton Elks
1970s in Montreal
1979 in Quebec
1979 in Canadian television
November 1979 sports events in Canada